Deuterocohnia glandulosa is a plant species in the genus Deuterocohnia. This species is endemic to Bolivia.

References

glandulosa
Flora of Bolivia